Palmers Green is a suburban area and electoral ward in North London, England, within the London Borough of Enfield. It is home to the largest population of Greek Cypriots outside Cyprus and is often nicknamed "Little Cyprus" or "Palmers Greek".

Etymology 
Recorded as Palmers grene 1608, 'village green associated with a family called Palmer' (mentioned in local records from the 14th century), from the Middle English grene.

History
Palmers Green was once a tiny hamlet in the parish of Edmonton, situated at the junction of Green Lanes and Fox Lane. Its population was very small, and there were no more than a few isolated houses in the mid-17th century. Local records mention a Palmers Field in 1204 and a Palmers Grove in 1340. Palmers Green is mentioned as a highway in 1324 (in Westminster Abbey Muniments).

By 1801 the area had grown to a village of 54 buildings, including two inns (according to the Middlesex Record Office). In 1871 the railway line from Wood Green to Enfield was opened and a station was built in Aldermans Hill to serve Palmers Green (half a mile away from the nearest houses).

The area remained largely undeveloped for thirty more years, as local landowners refused to sell their large estates for building. In 1902, however, large tracts of land were sold for building and the area began to develop rapidly. The first large-scale developments were on the Old Park estate between Fox Lane and Aldermans Hill, and the Hazelwood Park Estate between Hazelwood Lane and Hedge Lane. Within the latter development the building that now serves as Hazelwood Infant School and Hazelwood Junior School was built in Hazelwood Lane in 1908.

Notable local buildings include Broomfield House and Truro House. The former Southgate Town Hall has now been converted into flats. The former Pilgrims Rest (reflecting the name Palmers – "medieval pilgrim who carried a palm branch as a token of having visited the Holy Land") has already been demolished for housing. The Fox public house, which has been in its present guise since 1904, was once the site of the Electric Mouse comedy venue.

The Intimate Theatre was opened in a building that had been built in 1931 as St Monica's Church Hall. Among the actors who performed there were Richard Attenborough, Vivien Leigh, Roger Moore and (in a mime production) David Bowie. It is no longer a repertory theatre and the building is no longer used exclusively for theatrical performances, but it is still often referred to as the Intimate Theatre. In 1992 the building housed a Radio Cracker studio.

In 1988 Palmers Green's only hospital, Greentrees Hospital, was closed and demolished.

Palmers Green today

There is a parade of shops known as Palmers Green Shopping Centre along Green Lanes, with many restaurants, clothing shops, independently owned cafes, beauty salons, and branches of Superdrug, Wetherspoons (The Alfred Herring), Boots UK, and Morrisons.

Broomfield House, in Broomfield Park, remains a burnt-out shell despite numerous redevelopment proposals and an appearance on the BBC2 programme Restoration. The Conservatory in the park has recently reopened after a refurbishment.

After more than 20 years of discussion, the North Circular A406 was widened to two lanes each way at Bounds Green, with various junction improvements. Some major congestion still exists on the A406.

Continuous segregated cycle lanes, junction improvements and rearranged on-street parking on and around Green Lanes have been created by Enfield Council following a successful bid for "Mini Holland" funding from the Mayor of London via TfL. The lanes extend as far south as the A406. The aim is to encourage more commuter, school journeys and leisure cycling than was possible under the previous road layout, which combined four lane sections subject to speeding and other dangers to cyclists. Less than one year into their full opening, automated cycle counts at September 2018 already suggest 10-12k trips by bike per month within Palmers Green.

Public access to the New River waterway has been improved with waterside paths and access gates.

Demography
According to the 2011 census, 64% of the ward's population is white (34% British, 27% other, 3% Irish). 6% was Indian and 5% of 'any other ethnic group'. The main foreign languages are Turkish, spoken by 795 people, and Greek, spoken by 605.

In popular culture
Green Lanes, the high street of Palmers Green, is featured in the "Knight Bus" sequence in the film Harry Potter and the Prisoner of Azkaban.

Palmers Green is mentioned in Jona Lewie's song "You'll Always Find Me in the Kitchen at Parties" (1980). The song's lyrics were written by Lewie's friend Keef Trouble, a fellow member of Brett Marvin and the Thunderbolts. The reference to Palmers Green was prompted by the fact that Trouble had split up with his girlfriend and was at a party thrown by his friend Charles "Charlie Farley" Hallinan near The Fox, Palmers Green. Jona Lewie slightly amended the words, but still mentioned the "do in Palmers Green".

Notable residents
 Peter Racine Fricker, composer. Lived at 53, Avondale Road between 1950 and 1964
 Christian David Ginsburg, biblical scholar.
 Alfred Herring, Victoria Cross recipient.
William Orbit, musician and producer was raised in Palmers Green.
 Paul Scott, author of The Jewel in the Crown, was born in Palmers Green on 25 March 1920.
 Freya Ridings, musician.
 Skepta and JME, grime music artists, lived in Palmers Green. They have filmed several music videos in the area.
 Stevie Smith, poet and novelist, lived at No 3 Avondale Road from 1905 until her death in 1971.
 Joe Strummer shared a flat at 18 Ash Grove in 1971 with Tymon Dogg.
 Thomas Wilde, 1st Baron Truro, owner of Truro House.

Transport
A train service runs at Palmers Green railway station, operated by Great Northern, with southbound trains running to Moorgate. Northbound trains run to Hertford North regularly and on to Stevenage once an hour. Some trains also terminate at Gordon Hill. During May 2019, the train service was disrupted due to platform works at Stevenage.

Bus routes 34, 102, 121, 141, 232, 299, 329, W4, W6, W9 and the N29 operate locally.

The North Circular Road and A10 are the main trunk roads. The A111 through Southgate gives access to the M25 motorway at junction 24.

An electric tramway along Green Lanes as far as Winchmore Hill was developed in 1907, helping to further develop the area. The tramway is now long gone.

Nearest places

 Winchmore Hill
 Edmonton, London
 Tottenham
 Wood Green
 Muswell Hill
 Bowes Park
 Southgate
 Enfield Town

Nearest tube stations
 Arnos Grove tube station
 Bounds Green tube station
 Southgate tube station
 Wood Green tube station

Nearest railway stations
 Palmers Green railway station
 Bowes Park railway station
 Winchmore Hill railway station

Education 
 Hazelwood Primary School
 Firs Farm Primary
 Oakthorpe Primary
 Palmers Green High School (Independent)
 St Michael at Bowes CE Junior
 Tottenhall Infant
 St Monica's RC Primary
 St Anne's Catholic High School

Churches
 Saint Monica's Church, Palmers Green (Roman Catholic)
 St John's Church (Anglican)
 Palmers Green Baptist Church
 Palmers Green United Reformed Church

Mosques 

 Palmers Green Mosque (Muslim Community & Education Centre)

References

Bibliography
Once Upon a Time in Palmers Green, Alan Dumayne, 1988.
Intimate Memories: The History of the Intimate Theatre, Palmers Green,, Geoff Bowden, 2006.

External links

Ward profile, Enfield Borough Council
A History of Edmonton Social Life from British History Online, including some history of Palmers Green social life
The official site of Hazelwood Infant School
The official site of Hazelwood Junior School
The official site of Palmers Green High School
Schools in or near Palmers Green
 Palmers Green history, people and community

 
Areas of London
Districts of the London Borough of Enfield
Places formerly in Middlesex
District centres of London